Volvarina borroi is a species of sea snail, a marine gastropod mollusk in the family Marginellidae, the margin snails.

Description

Distribution
This marine species occurs in the Gulf of Mexico.

References

 Espinosa J. & Ortea J. (1999) Nuevos datos anatómicos y posición sistemática de marginelas cubanas (Mollusca: Gastropoda: Marginellidae). Avicennia 10-11: 187–188. 
 Cossignani T. (2006). Marginellidae & Cystiscidae of the World. L'Informatore Piceno. 408pp
 Rosenberg, G., F. Moretzsohn, and E. F. García. 2009. Gastropoda (Mollusca) of the Gulf of Mexico, Pp. 579–699 in Felder, D.L. and D.K. Camp (eds.), Gulf of Mexico–Origins, Waters, and Biota. Biodiversity. Texas A&M Press, College Station, Texas

Marginellidae
Gastropods described in 1998